Účastníci zájezdu (Holiday Makers) is a Czech comedy film based on the 1996 novel Účastníci zájezdu (The Sightseers) by Michal Viewegh. It was released in 2006.

Cast 
 David Hlaváč - Roko
 Šárka Opršálová - Irma
 Miroslav Krobot - Karel (older)
 Eva Leinweberová - Jituš
 Anna Polívková - Jolana
 Eva Holubová - Jolana's mother
 Bohumil Klepl - Jolana's father
 Jana Štěpánková - Helga 
 Jitka Kocurová - Pamela 
 Kristýna Leichtová - Denisa 
 Martin Pechlát - Vladimír 
 Martin Sitta - Jarda
 Jaromír Nosek - Ignác 
 Ondrej Koval - Max

External links
 

2006 films
2006 comedy films
Czech comedy films
2000s Czech films